The Aquatics events at the 2002 Commonwealth Games' were held at the Manchester Aquatics Centre in Manchester, England. The sports featured 54 events in three disciplines:
Diving (6)
Swimming (42)
Synchronized Swimming (2)

Diving

Men

Women

Swimming

Men

 Swimmers who participated in the heats only and received medals.

Women

Synchronised swimming

See also
List of Commonwealth Games records in swimming

References
2002 Commonwealth Game Results

2002
2002 in water sports
2002 Commonwealth Games events
Swimming at the 2002 Commonwealth Games